The American Free Press is a weekly newspaper published in the United States.

The newspaper's direct ancestor was The Spotlight, which ceased publication in 2001 when its parent organization, Liberty Lobby, was forced into bankruptcy. One of the paper's founders was Willis Carto, a white supremacist who promoted antisemitic conspiracy theories and Holocaust denial.

History
American Free Press was founded by Willis Carto. Carto was most politically involved in his career throughout the 1960s. He was known for his extremist ideologies in white supremacist and anti-semitic movements.

Contributors 

Writers for the newspaper included Michael Collins Piper, whose work has been characterized as anti-semitic and James P. Tucker, Jr., a longtime Spotlight reporter whose focus was the Bilderberg Group.  Articles by Carto also appeared occasionally. James Edwards, host of The Political Cesspool (broadcast as a service of the neo-Nazi Stormfront), was also a former writer for the newspaper.

The newspaper also runs columns by Joe Sobran, James Traficant, Paul Craig Roberts, Ron Paul, and others.  The newspaper's podcast series has featured guests including Brian Baird, Philip Giraldi, Dean Baker, and others.

Attendees of the 2006 American Free Press/The Barnes Review, conference included Arthur J. Jones, former member Nationalist Socialist White People's Party.

Some authors of the American Free Press such as Michael Collins Piper and Carto-affiliated institutions such as the Institute for Historical Review have published books which have been published in paper and electronic format on the America First Books website. William B. Fox is the publisher. It promotes nationalist viewpoints similar to those of the American Free Press and its authors.

Eustace Mullins was on the editorial staff of the American Free Press.

Criticism 
The Southern Poverty Law Center considers it a hate group and says that it "carries stories on Zionism, secret 'New World Order' conspiracies, American Jews and Israel."  One of the newspaper's ex-contract reporters, Christopher Bollyn, has advocated on behalf of the 9/11 Truth Movement. The Anti-Defamation League has criticised the newspaper and, in particular, Bollyn for linking of prominent figures in the Jewish community with the events of September 11, 2001, and in September 2006 attacked the newspaper for disseminating "antisemitic propaganda".

Pro-Israel conservative activists, such as Kenneth R. Timmerman, have criticized contributors to the American Free Press. In a May 2011 article, contributor Mark Dankof protested the British government's attempt to shut down Press TV, blaming it on "media outlets and correspondents with provable connections to the American Jewish lobby; Israeli intelligence; and Neo-Conservatives thirsting for a War of Civilizations with Iran specifically, and the Islamic world generally."

See also

List of newspapers in the United States

References

External links
 

Publications with year of establishment missing
Conspiracist media
Weekly newspapers published in the United States
Nationalist organizations
Political theories
Politics and race in the United States
White supremacy in the United States
Antisemitic publications